Ignacy Domeyko or Domejko, pseudonym: Żegota (31 July 1802 – 23 January 1889) was a Polish geologist, mineralogist, educator, and founder of the University of Santiago, in Chile. Domeyko spent most of his life, and died, in his adopted country, Chile.

After a youth passed in partitioned Poland, Domeyko participated in the Polish–Russian War 1830–31. Upon Russian victory, he was exiled, spending part of his life in France (where he had gone with a fellow Philomath, Polish poet Adam Mickiewicz) before eventually settling in Chile, whose citizen he became.

He lived some 50 years in Chile and made major contributions to the study of that country's geography, geology and mineralogy. His observations on the circumstances of poverty-stricken miners and of their wealthy exploiters had a profound influence on those who would go on to shape Chile's labor movement.

Domeyko is seen as having had close ties to several countries and thus in 2002, when UNESCO organized a series of commemorations of the 200th anniversary of his birth, he was referred to as "a citizen of the world".

Life

Early life 

Ignacy Domeyko was born in the then Russian partition of the former Polish–Lithuanian Commonwealth, at Niedźwiadka Wielka Manor (Bear Cub Manor) near Nieśwież, Minsk Governorate, Imperial Russia (now Karelichy district, Belarus). The Domeyko family held the Polish Dangiel coat of arms. Ignacy's father, Hipolit Domeyko, who was president of the local land court, died when Ignacy was seven years old; the boy's uncles then served as his guardians.

In his youth Ignacy was a subject of the Russian Empire. He had, however, been brought up in the culture of the Polish–Lithuanian Commonwealth, a multicultural state whose educated and dominant classes had spoken Polish as a lingua franca. Shortly before Domeyko's birth, the Commonwealth had been dismembered in the partitions of the Polish–Lithuanian Commonwealth. For this reason, and because Domeyko subsequently spent most of his life in Chile, he is considered a person of national importance to Poles, Belarusians, Lithuanians, and Chileans.

Domeyko enrolled at Vilnius University, then known as the Imperial University of Vilna, in 1816 as a student of mathematics and physics. He studied under Jędrzej Śniadecki. Involved with the Philomaths, a secret student organisation dedicated to Polish culture and the restoration of Poland's independence, he was a close friend of Adam Mickiewicz. In 1823–24, during the investigation and trials of the Philomaths, Domeyko and Mickiewicz spent months incarcerated at Vilnius' Uniate Basilian monastery.

After participating in the November 1830 Uprising, in which Domeyko served as an officer under General Dezydery Chłapowski, in 1831 Domeyko was forced into exile in order not to face Russian reprisals.

Exile 
Journeying through Germany, he arrived in France, where he would earn an engineering degree at Paris' École des Mines (School of Mining). He also studied at the Sorbonne and maintained his political engagements with Belarusians, Poles, and Lithuanians.

Chile 

In 1838 Domeyko left for Chile. There he made substantial contributions to mineralogy and the technology of mining, studied several previously unknown minerals, advocated for the civil rights of the native tribal peoples, and was a meteorologist and ethnographer. He is also credited with introducing the metric system to Latin America.

He served as a professor at a mining college in Coquimbo (La Serena) and after 1847 at the University of Chile (Universidad de Chile, in Santiago), of which he was rector for 16 years (1867–83).
Domeyko gained Chilean citizenship in 1849, but declared at the time that "I may now never change my citizenship, but God grants me hope that wherever I may be—whether in the  Cordilleras or in [the Vilnius suburb of] Paneriai—I shall die a Lithuanian." The term "Lithuanian" at that time designated any inhabitant, whatever his ethnicity, of the territories of the former Grand Duchy of Lithuania.

In 1884 Domeyko returned for an extended visit to Europe and remained there until 1889, visiting his birthplace and other places in the former Commonwealth, as well as Paris and Jerusalem.

In 1887 he was awarded an honorary doctorate by the Jagiellonian University, in Kraków.

In 1889, soon after returning to Santiago, Chile, Domeyko died.

Memorials

Named in honour of Domeyko are; a Cuban found genus of plants Domeykoa, the mineral domeykite, the shellfish Nautilus domeykus, the genus of dinosaur Domeykosaurus, the ammonite Amonites domeykanus, asteroid 2784 Domeyko, the Cordillera Domeyko mountain range in the Andes, and the Chilean town of Domeyko.

A bronze bust of Domeyko stands in the Casa Central de la Universidad de Chile, of which Domeyko was long-time rector.

In 1992, a plaque in Spanish and Polish was placed on a building at Krakowskie Przedmieście 64, in Warsaw, Poland, commemorating the "distinguished son of the Polish nation and eminent citizen of Chile."

On the 200th anniversary of his birth, UNESCO declared 2002 to be "Ignacy Domeyko Year." Several commemorative events were held in Chile under the auspices of Polish President Aleksander Kwaśniewski and Chilean President Ricardo Lagos.

In 2002, Poland and Chile jointly issued a postage stamp commemorating the 200th anniversary of Domeyko's birth.

Also in 2002, a 200th-birthday plaque honoring him was placed in the entry gate to Uniate Basilian monastery in Vilnius, Lithuania, where he and Adam Mickiewicz were held in 1823–24 during the investigation and trials of the Philomaths.

In 2015 a Belarusian climber Pavel Gorbunov placed a memorial plate on the top of Cerro Kimal in Cordillera Domeyko.

Notes

See also
Biblioteca Polaca Ignacio Domeyko
Polish-Lithuanian (adjective)
List of minor planets named after people
List of Poles

References

  Polish language
  Polish language
  Polish language
  Polish language
  Portuguese language
  review, Polish language
 Paz Domeyko Lea-Plaza.  Ignacio Domeyko. La Vida de un Emigrante. Santiago, Chile.2002. Random House Mondadori (Editorial Sudamericana) Spanish language
 Paz Domeyko.  A Life in Exile.  Ignacy Domeyko 1802-1889.  Sydney, Australia 2005.   }.9. English language. Available from author.  See website Paz Domeyko, www.domeyko.org

External links 

 Works of Ignacy Domeyko in the digital library Polona.
  Memoirs of Ignacy Domeyko
  2002 Polish conference on Ignacy Domeyko . Contains a selection of articles and book reviews, some in English
  Honorata Szocik, Życie Ignacego Domeyki, jego prace, wkład do geologii i nauk społecznych, Nasz Czas 37 (576)
  Proceedings of a 2002 Belarusian conference about Domeyko.
Ignacy Domeyko. Polymath Virtual Library, Fundación Ignacio Larramendi
Museum about Polish Explorer Being Built in Chile

1802 births
1889 deaths
People from Karelichy District
People from Novogrudsky Uyezd
19th-century Lithuanian nobility
19th-century Polish nobility
Belarusian nobility
Polish Roman Catholics
19th-century Chilean geologists
Chilean geographers
Chilean people of Polish descent
19th-century Polish geologists
Lithuanian geologists
Polish mineralogists
Polish geographers
Belarusian geographers
Belarusian geologists
Belarusian mineralogists
Emigrants from the Russian Empire to Chile
November Uprising participants
Naturalized citizens of Chile
Vilnius University alumni